Flagel is a French surname. Notable people with the surname include:

 Claude Flagel (1932–2020), French musician
 Scott Flagel (born 1961), Canadian footballer
 Shelly Flagel, American behavioral neuroscientist

French-language surnames